Azerbaijan competed at the 2018 European Athletics Championships in Berlin, Germany, from 6–12 August 2018. A delegation of 3 athletes were sent to represent the country.

The following athletes were selected to compete by the Azerbaijan Athletics Federation.

 Men 
Field events

Women
Field events

References

Nations at the 2018 European Athletics Championships
2018
European Athletics Championships